Foresta (formerly, McCauley and Opim) is an unincorporated community in Mariposa County, California, within Yosemite National Park. The Crane Creek census-designated place overlays the community.

The name comes from the Foresta Land Company, founded by A.B. Davis in 1913. Davis built a resort at Foresta but abandoned it.

The Opim post office operated there from 1882 to 1884.

References

Unincorporated communities in Mariposa County, California
Populated places in the Sierra Nevada (United States)
Yosemite National Park
Unincorporated communities in California